Sulfur nitride may refer to a number of sulfur nitrogen compounds:
pentasulfur hexanitride, 
tetrasulfur tetranitride, 
tetrasulfur dinitride, 
disulfur dinitride, 
polythiazyl, 
thiatetrazole, 

Additionally, some unstable species are known:
sulfur mononitride, SN, analogous to nitric oxide, NO
disulfur mononitride, analogous to nitrogen dioxide, .
monosulfur dinitride, analogous to nitrous oxide,

See also
Nitrogen oxides, which are valence isoelectronic with sulfur nitrides

References

Sulfur–nitrogen compounds